Dyrborg is a neighborhood in the city of Trondheim in Trøndelag county, Norway. It is a residential area that is located in the borough of Midtbyen, just west of the neighborhood of Ila, north of Byåsen, and south-west of Trolla.

References

Geography of Trondheim
Neighbourhoods of Trondheim